Unser Charly (in English Our Charly) is a German television series produced by Phoenix Film and broadcast on ZDF. It ran from 27 December 1995 to 9 June 2012.

See also
List of German television series

External links
 

1995 German television series debuts
2012 German television series endings
Television shows about apes
2000s German television series
German-language television shows
ZDF original programming